Cornellius "Tank" Carradine (born February 18, 1990) is a former American football defensive end. He was drafted by the San Francisco 49ers in the second round of the 2013 NFL Draft. He played college football at Florida State.

Early years
Carradine was born in Cincinnati, Ohio.  He attended Taft High School in Cincinnati, and played high school football for the Taft Senators.

College career
Carradine initially attended Butler Community College.  He transferred to Florida State University, where he played for coach Jimbo Fisher's Florida State Seminoles football team in 2011 and 2012. Carradine totaled 11 sacks in 11 games in 2012, and suffered a season-ending torn ACL injury in November 2012.

Professional career

San Francisco 49ers
The San Francisco 49ers selected Carradine in the second round, with the 40th overall pick, of the 2013 NFL Draft.

On August 27, 2013, he was placed on the reserve/non-football injury list. On October 29, 2013, he was activated and placed on the 53-man active roster.

In the 2016 offseason, Carradine moved to outside linebacker and put his weight down to 273 pounds. On September 6, 2016, Carradine signed a one-year contract extension with the 49ers through 2018.

On September 25, 2017, Carradine was placed on injured reserve with a high ankle sprain. He was activated off injured reserve to the active roster on November 25, 2017.

Oakland Raiders
On March 17, 2018, Carradine signed with the Oakland Raiders. He was released by the Raiders on October 6, 2018 per his request due to limited playing time.

Miami Dolphins
On February 15, 2019, Carradine signed with the Miami Dolphins. He was released on August 31, 2019. He was re-signed on September 12, 2019. He was released on September 24, 2019.

References

External links
Florida State Seminoles bio

1990 births
Living people
African-American players of American football
Players of American football from Cincinnati
American football defensive tackles
American football outside linebackers
American football defensive ends
Butler Grizzlies football players
Florida State Seminoles football players
San Francisco 49ers players
Oakland Raiders players
Miami Dolphins players
21st-century African-American sportspeople
20th-century African-American people